Jessica Javelet (born June 25, 1985) is an American rugby union player. She attended the University of Louisville from 2003–2007, where she played field hockey. She led the nation in scoring her junior season (2005), and she finished her career as a three-time All-American and the school record-holder for both points and goals. She was also a three-time academic All-American, a finalist for the NCAA Woman of the Year Award, and the valedictorian of her 2007 class, having graduated with a 4.0 GPA in marketing. She is a former field hockey player and played for the United States women's team from 2006 to 2009. 

She made her debut for the sevens team at the 2014 USA Women's Sevens. Javelet was selected for the sevens team for the Rio Olympics. She and her team won their first Olympic match in Rio against Colombia by 48 points to 0 points.

References

External links
 Jessica Javelet at USA Rugby
 

1985 births
Living people
United States international rugby sevens players
Female rugby sevens players
American female rugby sevens players
Rugby sevens players at the 2016 Summer Olympics
Olympic rugby sevens players of the United States
Louisville Cardinals field hockey players
American female field hockey players
United States women's international rugby union players
American female rugby union players